Menticirrhus is a genus of fish in family Sciaenidae. They are commonly known as kingcroakers or kingfish.

Species

Menticirrhus americanus - Southern kingfish: This species grows to 20 inches (51 cm) in length.  Seven to eight dark bands mark the sides which shade from dusky above to almost white on the belly, and the inside of the operculum has a dusky coloration.  They are found from the Western Caribbean Sea to Cape Cod and most of South and Central America's east coast, over sand or mud in depths of at least 5 feet (1.5 m).  This species is prized for its flesh, and is fished both commercially and recreationally.

Menticirrhus littoralis - Gulf kingfish: The body is silvery in color, lacks a dusky operculum and occurs in the surf zone from the Gulf of Mexico to Florida.  In all other respects it is similar to M. americanus.

Menticirrhus saxatilis - Northern kingfish: The size, habits, range and fishery is similar to M. americanus.  The coloration is the same too, except for a dark V-shaped mark on the shoulder.

Menticirrhus undulatus - California corbina

Fishing for kingcroakers

Though not as highly prized for sport as other fish may be, kingcroakers (also known as whiting in Florida and sea mullet in North Carolina) have the ability to pull out some little, zippy runs. Most specimens that are caught are half a pound or less, but some can reach one or even two pounds. Kingcroakers are most often caught in the surf, but are sometimes found off piers near inlets or in bays. Good lures include small jigs, small spoons, and small plastics. The bait fisherman is best suited with sand fleas or molecrabs, which can be bought frozen at almost any tackle shop or caught live on the beach (look for Vs in the sand pointing towards shore when a wave starts to recede, and start digging a couple inches until you feel a sand flea). Cut shrimp is a close second. In Long Island New York's Captree State Park, these fish are simply known as "kingfish." They average in size from 12 inches to 14 inches. Clams seem to be the best bait to catch them.

Cooking kingcroakers
Most kingcroakers are too small to fillet, so pan-dressing them is usually the way they are cooked. When big enough they produce mild, but good fillets. A fish fry is best suited for kingcroakers.

References

Sciaenidae
Extant Miocene first appearances
Ray-finned fish genera